Charles John Allwood (August 1951) is a British businessman, and a former Chief Executive of Orange UK.

Early life
He was born in Doncaster and educated at Oundle School.

He received a degree in Economics & Statistics from the University of Exeter in 1973.

Career

News International
In 1986 he became Finance Director of News International Newspapers, then Finance Director from 1989-91 of Sky Television plc.

Trinity Mirror
From 1999 to 2000 he was Chief Executive of Trinity Mirror Group.

Orange
From 1991–92 he had been Finance Director of Microtel Communications Ltd, which became Orange Personal Communications Services Ltd in April 1994. He became Chief Executive of Orange UK in December 2000.

Daily Telegraph
He worked with Telegraph Media Group from 2004 to 2007.

Personal life
His first wife was Fay Harnan. They have a son (born 1982) and a daughter (born 1985).  He has since remarried and lives in Somerset.

References

External links
 Biography
 2004 interview

1951 births
Alumni of the University of Exeter
British technology chief executives
British telecommunications industry businesspeople
Orange S.A.
People educated at Oundle School
People from Dacorum (district)
People from Doncaster
Telegraph Media Group
Reach plc
Living people